A floater is a shadow-like shape that appears singly or together with several others in the field of vision of some individuals.

Floater may also refer to:

 Floater (band), a band based in Portland, Oregon
 The Floaters, an R&B singing group of the 1970s
 Floaters (album), 1977
 "Floater (Too Much to Ask)", a song from the 2001 Bob Dylan album Love and Theft
 Floating rate note, in finance, a bond with variable coupon rates
 Floating rib, a bone in the human rib cage not connected to the sternum
 Pie floater, an Australian meal comprising a meat pie floating in pea soup
 "Floater", another name for a "teardrop" or "runner" in basketball, in which a smaller offensive player performs a high arcing shot over the reach of taller defenders in the lane

See also 
 Float (disambiguation)